The Ewiiaapaayp Band of Kumeyaay Indians, formerly known as the Cuyapaipe Community of Diegueño Mission Indians of the Cuyapaipe Reservation, is a federally recognized tribe of Kumeyaay Indians, who are sometimes known as Mission Indians, located in San Diego County, California. "Ewiiaapaayp" is Kumeyaay for "leaning rock," a prominent feature on the reservation.

Reservation
The Ewiiaapaayp Indian Reservation, formerly known as the Cuyapaipe Reservation, is a federal Indian reservation located in the Laguna Mountains of southern East County, San Diego. The reservation was created in 1891 by the US Congress.

Two parcels of land form the reservation. Only 1% of this arable, with the majority being steep and rocky. No public utilities are available on this parcel. Because of the inaccessibility to this reservation, many Ewiiaapaayp families moved and enrolled in other Kumeyaay tribes.

That land is leased to the Southern Indian Health Council, which provides health care for seven Kumeyaay tribes as well as non-Natives living in the area.

In recent years, 13 people lived on seven houses on the reservation and bred horses. The only access to the reservation is on foot, since it is serviced by a dirt road, gated in several locations. In 1973, two of the five enrolled members lived on the reservation.

Government
The Ewiiaapaayp Band is headquartered in Alpine, California. They are governed by a democratically elected tribal council, according to their constitution, ratified in 1973 and amended in 2002. They are a self-governance tribe, as outlined in the Indian Self-Determination and Education Assistance Act. Robert Pinto is their current tribal chairperson.

Tribal members
Enrolled members include Michael Garcia; Harlan Pinto, Jr.; Harlan Pinto, Sr.; Gloria Pinto; Robert Pinto, Sr.; Robert Pinto Jr.; and James Robertson.

Economic development
In 2006, the tribe formed Leaning Rock Water, a company providing bottled drinking water.

Education
The reservation's small exclave that's completely surrounded by the Alpine, California CDP is served by the Alpine Union Elementary School District and Grossmont Union High School District, while the rest of the reservation is served by the Mountain Empire Unified School District.

Activities
The reservation hosts an annual three-day celebration, the Ewiiaapaayp Gathering, at Thing Valley ranch during the last week of July. Gates are opened, and the public is welcome. The gathering features birdsongs, basket weaving, acorn processing and other cultural demonstrations, camping, peon games, and a barbecue.

See also
 Mountain Empire, San Diego

Bibliography
 Eargle, Jr., Dolan H. Northern California Guide: Weaving the Past and Present. San Francisco: Tree Company Press, 2000. .
 Pritzker, Barry M. A Native American Encyclopedia: History, Culture, and Peoples. Oxford: Oxford University Press, 2000. .
 Shipek, Florence C. "History of Southern California Mission Indians." Handbook of North American Indians. Volume ed. Heizer, Robert F. Washington, DC: Smithsonian Institution, 1978. 610-618. .

References

External links
 Kumeyaay.com: official Ewiiaapaap Band of Kumeyaay Indians, Cuyapaipe Reservation website
 Kumeyaay.info: The Kumeyaay Tribes Guide — Tribal Bands of the Kumeyaay Nation (Diegueño) — in San Diego County, California + Baja California state, México.

Kumeyaay
California Mission Indians
Federally recognized tribes in the United States
Laguna Mountains
Native American tribes in San Diego County, California
Native American tribes in California
East County (San Diego County)